The All-African People's Revolutionary Party (A-APRP) is a socialist political party founded by Kwame Nkrumah and organized in Conakry, Guinea in 1968. The party expanded to the United States in 1972 and claims to have recruited members from 33 countries. According to the party, global membership in the party is "in the hundreds".

Nkrumah's goal in founding the party was to create and manage the political economic conditions necessary for the emergence of an All-African People's Revolutionary Army that would lead the military struggle against "settler colonialism, Zionism, neo-colonialism, imperialism and all other forms of capitalist oppression and exploitation."

Concept and philosophy
As described by Dave Blevins and other scholars like Carole Boyce Davies, "the ideology of the A-APRP is Nkrumahism—Toureism, which takes its name from the founder, and his primary colleague in arms, President Ahmed Sekou Toure."

Kwame Nkrumah, the founder, introduced the party's concept and philosophy in his book, Handbook of Revolutionary Warfare - released in 1968 by Panaf Books, 

Some of the key concepts include:
 promotion of African unity 
 embracing the need and characteristics of African civilization and ideology  
 working for economical and technological advancement

The party supports: 
 Pan-Africanism — "a total liberation and unification of Africa under Scientific Socialism" 
 Black Power — "the belief that real black freedom will only come when Africa is politically united" 
 Scientific Socialism — "the idea that modern technology can be reconciled with human values, in which an advanced technological society is realized without the social upheaval and deep schisms that occur in capitalist industrial societies"

In an attempt to articulate effectively the issues facing African people and the African woman, the A-APRP also infused gender politics into its ideology and organisational structure. This resulted in the formation of the All-African Women's Revolutionary Union in 1980. This women's wing of the party emerged specifically to address issues surrounding gender oppression with racism and classism.

Chapters
The building of the A-APRP began to take form in 1968 with the creation of "the first A-APRP Work-Study Circle in Guinea under the leadership of Kwame -Ture", and later in the United States, Canada, the Caribbean, England, France, and numerous countries in Africa. Since 1968, the A-APRP "has recruited Africans born in more than 33 countries."

References

Bibliography
Asante, Molefi Kete; Mazama, Ama; Cérol, Marie-José; Encyclopedia of Black Studies, SAGE (2005), pp. 77–8,   (Retrieved 19 July 2019)
Blevins, Dave, American Political Parties in the 21st Century. McFarland (2006), pp. 8–9,   (Retrieved 19 July 2019)
Boyce Davies, Carole, Encyclopedia of the African Diaspora: Origins, Experiences, and Culture, Volume 2, ABC-CLIO (2008), pp. 78–9,   (Retrieved 19 July 2019)
Gates, Henry Louis Gates, Jr., African American Lives (editors: Henry Louis Gates, W E B DuBois Professor of Humanities Chair of Afro-American Studies and Director of the W E B DuBois Institute for Afro-American Research Henry Louis Gates, Jr, Evelyn Brooks Higginbotham, Victor S Thomas Professor of History and of African and African American Studies Evelyn Brooks Higginbotham;  contributors: W.E.B. Du Bois Institute for Afro-American Research, American Council of Learned Societies), Oxford University Press, USA (2004), p. 142 ,  (Retrieved 21 July 2019)
Springer, Kimberly, Still Lifting, Still Climbing: African American Women's Contemporary Activism, NYU Press (1999), p. 174,    (Retrieved 19 July 2019)

Further reading
Nkrumah, Kwame, Handbook of Revolutionary Warfare - released in 1968 by Panaf Books, 
Nkrumah, Francis Nwia Kofie / Nkrumah, Kwame, Handbook of Revolutionary Warfare: A Guide to the Armed Phase of the African Revolution, International Publishers (1969)
Harris, Robert L Jr.; Terborg-Penn, Rosalyn; The Columbia Guide to African American History Since 1939, Columbia University Press (2006), p. 109, 
Upping the Anti, Issue 6 (journal), UTA Publications (May 2008), pp. 35–42,  
Thomas, Greg, The Sexual Demon of Colonial Power: Pan-African Embodiment and Erotic Schemes of Empire, Indiana University Press (2007), pp. ix, 69,  

1968 establishments in Guinea
African socialist political parties
Anti-imperialist organizations
Anti-Zionism in Africa
Anti-Zionist political parties
Black political parties in the United States
Nkrumaist political parties
Pan-African organizations
Pan-Africanism in Ghana
Pan-Africanist political parties in Africa
Political parties established in 1968
Political parties in Africa
Socialist parties in Ghana
Transnational political parties